is a television show spinoff of the Godzilla franchise. It premiered on October 6, 1997, and ran for a total of 256 three-minute episodes, finishing on September 30, 1998.

Set in 2097, most of Earth's kaiju (monsters) live on an island out in the Pacific Ocean called Godzilla Island, which is monitored by G-Guard. The creatures living on the island include Godzilla, Godzilla Junior, Mothra, Mothra Leo, Rodan, Fire Rodan, King Ghidorah, Mecha-King Ghidorah,  Mechagodzilla (the Heisei version), Anguirus, Gigan, Hedorah, Destoroyah, Baragon, King Caesar, Moguera, Megalon, Battra, SpaceGodzilla, Gorosaurus, Kamacuras and Jet Jaguar. Torema and Zaguresu's kaiju (or monsters) include a black-coloured Mechagodzilla (the Showa version), a fully mechanical King Ghidorah (called Hyper-Mecha King Ghidorah), a new version of Hedorah (called Neo Hedorah), Kumasogami (named Dororin in the series), Jigora (a species of kaiju from Torema's home planet that looks like pallette swaps of Godzilla Junior), a powered-up version of SpaceGodzilla, a different version of Fake Godzilla, Proto Moguera (Which resembles the original Moguera from The Mysterians) and Gororin (a sentient ball-shaped cactus). One kaiju that did not appear in a Godzilla movie, a miniature version of Dogora, also appears for a few episodes, working with Zaguresu. For unknown reasons, Kumonga, Ebirah, Varan, Manda, the Showa Mechagodzilla, Titanosaurus, Gabara, Minilla, Biollante, Oodako, Ookondoru, and Shockiras were not included, while King Kong was excluded for legal reasons. None of the Showa- or Heisei-era kaiju from Toho's other non-Godzilla movies appear in this series either.

An unusually large number of tie-in toys were produced for this series by Bandai, because this series was, in fact, created through the use of action figures.

A CD of theme music, mostly composed by Akira Ifukube, was released in 1997 by Polygram entitled 'Welcome To Godzilla Island'.

In 2007, a 4-disc DVD set including every episode of the show was released in Japan at a price of 16000 yen (approx. $160).

Cast 
G-Guard Commander: Jiro Dan
Lucas: Kenichiro Shimamura
Torema: Maimi Okuwa
Zaguresu, Xilien: Naoko Aizawa
Narrator: Yutaka Aoyama

Episodes

References

External links

1997 Japanese television series debuts
1998 Japanese television series endings
Japan in fiction
Mothra
TV Tokyo original programming
Television series set in the 2090s
Tokusatsu television series
Godzilla television series
2097
Television series about dinosaurs